Ōtorohanga District Council is the territorial authority for the Ōtorohanga District of New Zealand.

The council consists of the mayor of Ōtorohanga, and seven ward councillors.

Composition

Councillors

 Mayor 
 Waipa Ward: Deputy Mayor Roy Johnson
 Kāwhia/Tihiroa Ward: Annette Williams
 Kiokio/Korakonui Ward: Bryan Ferguson
 Ōtorohanga Ward: Katrina Christison
 Kāwhia/Tihiroa Ward: Kit Jeffries
 Wharepuhunga Ward: Robyn Klos
 Ōtorohanga Ward: Rodney Dow

Community boards

 Ōtorohanga Community Board: Neville Gadd, Katrina Christison, Alan Buckman, Kat Brown-Merrin, Peter Coventry, Rodney Dow
 Kawhia Community Board: Dave Walsh, Ken Briggs, Annette Williams, George Fletcher, Hinga Whiu

History

The council was established in 1989. It replaced a council of the same name established in 1976, which replaced the Otorohanga County Council established in 1922.

References

External links

 Official website

Ōtorohanga District
Politics of Waikato
Territorial authorities of New Zealand